Emma Lowndes (born 1975) is an English actress, known for portraying Bella Gregson in Cranford, Mary Rivers in Jane Eyre and Margie Drewe in Downton Abbey.

Background
Brought up in Irlam, near Manchester, Lowndes attended Irlam Primary School and Urmston Grammar School, where she was Head Girl. She studied English at the University of York before training at RADA, graduating in 2000. Her training was partly funded by the Salford Sports and Arts Trust, established by Albert Finney and Harold Riley to assist the city's young talent.

Lowndes is the eldest of three siblings born to Eric and Suzanne Lowndes. She has a younger brother, footballer Nathan Lowndes, and a sister, Katie Lowndes.
Lowndes lives in London with her partner, Jason Merrells and their daughter.

Career
Lowndes' television credits include Waking the Dead, Burn It, Afterlife, Doctors, Vera, Silent Witness, Heartbeat, Downton Abbey and Moving On. She also played Mary Rivers in the 2006 BBC adaptation of Jane Eyre and Bella Gregson in Cranford.

Lowndes has appeared in the films All or Nothing (2002), This Little Life (2003), Mother's Milk (2011) and Frozen (2005). She has lent her voice to the radio dramas Whitby Pier, Aperture and Hanging, and played Sarah Badger in the 2001 The Tomorrow People audio drama, The New Gods.

Her theatre work includes Whose Life Is It Anyway?, The Rise and Fall of Little Voice, The Seagull, Port and Cold Meat Party. She has also appeared in productions of Thérèse Raquin, Measure for Measure, Topless Mum and Three More Sleepless Nights. She joined the cast of Harry Potter and the Cursed Child at the Palace Theatre, London from 24 May 2017, playing the role of Ginny Potter.

Awards
Lowndes won Best Actress in a Leading Role at the 2003 Manchester Evening News Theatre Awards for productions of Port and The Seagull at the Royal Exchange Theatre. Her role in The Seagull also earned her a nomination at the 2003 Ian Charleson Awards.

Filmography

Television

Film

Selected theatre performances
 Rachel in Port by Simon Stephens . World premiere directed by Marianne Elliott at the Royal Exchange, Manchester. Lowndes won a MEN Award for her performance. (2002)
 Nina in The Seagull by Anton Chekov. Directed by Greg Hersov at the Royal Exchange, Manchester. Lowndes won a MEN Award for her performance. (2003)
 Nancy in Cold Meat Party by Brad Fraser. World premiere directed by Braham Murray at the Royal Exchange, Manchester. (2003)
 Little Voice in The Rise and Fall of Little Voice by Jim Cartwright. Directed by Sarah Frankcom at the Royal Exchange, Manchester. (2004)
 May in The Accrington Pals by Peter Whelan. Directed by James Dacre at the Royal Exchange, Manchester. (2013).

References

External links

1975 births
Living people
Alumni of RADA
Alumni of the University of York
English film actresses
English radio actresses
English stage actresses
English television actresses
English voice actresses
People from Irlam
Actresses from Salford
Actresses from Lancashire
21st-century English actresses